Dioecy (adj. dioecious) is a characteristic of certain species that have distinct unisexual individuals, each producing either male or female gametes, either directly (in animals) or indirectly (in seed plants). Dioecious reproduction is biparental reproduction. Dioecy has costs, since only about half the population directly produces offspring. It is one method for excluding self-fertilization and promoting allogamy (outcrossing), and thus tends to reduce the expression of recessive deleterious mutations present in a population. Plants have several other methods of preventing self-fertilization including, for example, dichogamy, herkogamy, and self-incompatibility.

Dioecy is a dimorphic sexual system, alongside gynodioecy and androdioecy.

In zoology

In zoology, dioecious species can be contrasted to hermaphroditic species, meaning that an individual is either male or female, in which case the synonym gonochory is more often used. For example, most animal species are gonochoric, almost all vertebrate species are gonochoric, and all bird and mammal species are gonochoric. Dioecy may also describe colonies within a species, such as the colonies of Siphonophorae (Portuguese man-of-war), which may be either dioecious or monoecious.

In botany
Land plants (embryophytes) differ from animals in that their life cycle involves alternation of generations. In animals, typically an individual produces haploid gametes of one kind, either sperms or egg cells. A sperm and an egg cell fuse to form a zygote that develops into a new individual. In land plants, by contrast, one generation – the sporophyte generation – consists of individuals that produce haploid spores rather than haploid gametes. Spores do not fuse, but germinate by dividing repeatedly by mitosis to give rise to haploid multicellular individuals which produce gametes – the gametophyte generation. A male gamete and a female gamete then fuse to produce a new diploid sporophyte. Sexual dimorphism is common in dioecious plants.

In bryophytes (mosses, liverworts and hornworts), the gametophytes are fully independent plants, and do not distinguish more than one type of spore, producing isospores. Seed plants (spermatophytes), are heterosporic, producing spores of two different sizes (heterospores). Other vascular non-seed plants may be heterosporous or isosporous.

Seed plant gametophytes are dependent on the sporophyte and develop within the spores, a condition known as endospory. In flowering plants, the male gametophytes develop within pollen grains produced by the sporophyte's stamens, and the female gametophytes develop within ovules produced by the sporophyte's carpels.

The sporophyte generation of a seed plant is called "monoecious" when each sporophyte plant has both kinds of spore-producing organ, so ultimately produces both male and female gametophytes and hence both male and female gametes. For example, a single flowering plant of a monoecious species has both functional stamens and carpels, either in separate flowers or in the same flower.

The sporophyte generation of seed plants is called "dioecious" when each sporophyte plant has only one kind of spore-producing organ, all of whose spores give rise either to male gametophytes, which produce only male gametes (sperm), or to female gametophytes, which produce only female gametes (egg cells). For example, a single flowering plant sporophyte of a fully dioecious species has either flowers with functional stamens producing pollen containing male gametes (staminate or 'male' flowers), or flowers with functional carpels producing female gametes (carpellate or 'female' flowers), but not both.  (See Plant reproductive morphology for further details, including more complex cases.)

Slightly different terms, dioicous and monoicous, may be used for the gametophyte generation, although dioecious and monoecious are also used. A dioicous gametophyte either produces only male gametes (sperm) or produces only female gametes (egg cells). About 60% of liverworts are dioicous.

In order for the distinction between dioecious and monoecious sporophytes to make sense, the plant must exhibit hetrospory. Thus, all dioecious plants must produce heterospores. Furthermore, all heteresporous plants must be dioicous.

Dioecy occurs in a wide variety of plant groups. Examples of dioecious plant species include ginkgos, willows, cannabis and African teak. As its specific name implies, the perennial stinging nettle Urtica dioica is dioecious, while the annual nettle Urtica urens is monoecious. Dioecious flora are predominant in tropical environments.

About 65% of gymnosperm species are dioecious, but almost all conifers are monoecious.
In gymnosperms, the sexual systems dioecy and monoecy are strongly correlated with the mode of pollen dispersal, monoecious species are predominantly wind dispersed (anemophily) and dioecious species animal-dispersed (zoophily).

About 6 percent of flowering plant species are entirely dioecious and about 7% of angiosperm genera contain some dioecious species. Dioecy is more common in woody plants, and heterotrophic species. In most dioecious plants, whether male or female gametophytes are produced is determined genetically, but in some cases it can be determined by the environment, as in Arisaema species.

Certain algae are dioecious. Dioecy is prevalent in the brown algae (Phaeophyceae) and may have been the ancestral state in that group.

Evolution of dioecy 

In plants, dioecy has evolved independently multiple times generally either from hermaphroditic species or from monoecious species. A previously untested hypothesis is that this reduces inbreeding. However dioecy has been shown to be associated with increased genetic diversity and greater protection against deleterious mutations.  Regardless of the evolutionary pathway the intermediate states need to have fitness advantages compared to  cosexual flowers in order to survive.

Dioecy evolves due to male or female sterility, although it is unlikely that mutations for male and female sterility occurred at the same time. In angiosperms unisexual flowers evolve from bisexual ones. Dioecy occurs in almost half of plant families, but only in a minority of genera, suggesting recent evolution. For 160 families that have dioecious species, dioecy is thought to have evolved more than 100 times.

In the family Caricaceae dioecy is likely the ancestral sexual system.

From monoecy 
Dioecious flowering plants can evolve from monoecious ancestors that have flowers containing both functional stamens and functional carpels.  Some authors argue monoecy and dioecy are related.

In the genus Sagittaria, since there is a distribution of sexual systems, it has been postulated that dioecy evolved from monoecy through gynodioecy mainly from mutations that resulted in male sterility. However, since the ancestral state is unclear, more work is needed to clarify the evolution of dioecy via monoecy.

From hermaphroditism 
Dioecy usually evolves from hermaphroditism through gynodioecy but may also evolve through androdioecy, through distyly or through heterostyly. In the Asteraceae, dioecy may have evolved independently from hermaphroditism at least 5 or 9 times. The reverse transition, from dioecy back to hermaphroditism has also been observed, both in Asteraceae and in bryophytes, with a frequency about half of that for the forward transition.

In Silene, since there is no monoecy, it is suggested that dioecy evolved through gynodioecy.

In mycology

Very few dioecious fungi have been discovered.

Monoecy and dioecy in fungi refer to the donor and recipient roles in mating, where a nucleus is transferred from one haploid hypha to another, and the two nuclei then present in the same cell merge by karyogamy to form a zygote. The definition avoids reference to male and female reproductive structures, which are rare in fungi. An individual of a dioecious fungal species not only requires a partner for mating, but performs only one of the roles in nuclear transfer, as either the donor or the recipient. A monoecious fungal species can perform both roles, but may not be self-compatible.

Adaptive benefit
Dioecy has the demographic disadvantage compared with hermaphroditism that only about half of reproductive adults are able to produce offspring. Dioecious species must therefore have fitness advantages to compensate for this cost through increased survival, growth, or reproduction. Dioecy excludes self-fertilization and promotes allogamy (outcrossing), and thus tends to reduce the expression of recessive deleterious mutations present in a population. In trees, compensation is realized mainly through increased seed production by females. This in turn is facilitated by a lower contribution of reproduction to population growth, which results in no demonstrable net costs of having males in the population compared to being hermaphroditic. Dioecy may also accelerate or retard lineage diversification in angiosperms. Dioecious lineages are more diversified in certain genera, but less in others. An analysis suggested that dioecy neither consistently places a strong brake on diversification, nor strongly drives it.

See also 
Gonochorism
Hermaphrodite
Plant reproductive morphology
Self-incompatibility in plants
Sexual dimorphism
Trioecy

References

Bibliography

Plant sexuality

Sexual reproduction
Reproductive system
Sexual system